Marcos Pérez Esquer (born 25 July 1970) is a Mexican politician from the National Action Party. From 2009 to 2012 he served as Deputy of the LXI Legislature of the Mexican Congress representing Sonora.

References

1970 births
Living people
Politicians from Sonora
National Action Party (Mexico) politicians
21st-century Mexican politicians
People from San Luis Río Colorado
Autonomous University of Baja California alumni
Deputies of the LXI Legislature of Mexico
Members of the Chamber of Deputies (Mexico) for Sonora